Filomina Hanisi (born 9 March 2001) is an Australian rugby league footballer who plays as a  for the Sydney Roosters in the NRL Women's Premiership and Mounties RLFC in the NSWRL Women's Premiership.

Background
Hanisi was born in Sydney and played her junior rugby league for the Concord Burwood Wolves. She is of Tongan descent.

Playing career
In 2018, Hanisi played for the Parramatta Eels in the Tarsha Gale Cup. In 2019, she joined the St George Dragons Tarsha Gale Cup side.

On 20th September 2019, she was announced as a development player for the St George Illawarra Dragons NRL Women's Premiership team.

2020
In 2020, Hanisi joined the Wests Tigers NSWRL Women's Premiership team. On 23 September, she was announced as a member of the Sydney Roosters NRL Women's Premiership squad.

In Round 1 of the 2020 NRL Women's season, she mader her debut for the Roosters in their 18–4 win over the St George Illawarra Dragons. At the end of the season, she won the Roosters' Rising Star award.

On 13 November, Hanisi made her State of Origin debut for New South Wales, coming off the bench and scoring a try in their 18–24 loss to Queensland.

Achievements and accolades

Individual
Sydney Roosters Rising Star: 2020

References

External links
Sydney Roosters profile

2001 births
Living people
Australian sportspeople of Tongan descent
Australian female rugby league players
Rugby league props
Sydney Roosters (NRLW) players